Baitul Hamd (House of Praise) is a mosque in Mississauga, Ontario west of Toronto run by the Ahmadiyya Muslim Community (AMJ) in Canada. It was purchased in 1999 from Trinity Club House. much of the exterior of the building has remained the same. The interior has been transformed into a place of worship. This building houses separate places of worship differentiated by gender, a large Islamic library, a homeopathic clinic, a large cafeteria and commercial kitchen and several offices along with a full size basketball court as well as volleyball net on the exterior. This Building has also served as the Jamia Ahmadiyya (Missionary Training College) for North America from 2003 - 2010. This mosques serves the needs of the communities of Mississauga.

See also 

 Baitul Islam
 List of mosques in Canada

References

External links 

 Ahmadiyya Muslim Jamaat Canada
 Peace Village
 Baitul Islam, Photo-Gallery
 panoramio.com: Jamia Ahmadiyya, Mississauga Photo 1

Ahmadiyya mosques in Canada
Mosques in Ontario
Buildings and structures in Mississauga
Islamic libraries
1999 establishments in Ontario